Muhammad Zuhair Aizat bin Mohd Nazri (born 1 October 1996) is a Malaysian footballer who plays as a midfielder for Sri Pahang.

Honours

Sri Pahang
 Malaysia FA Cup: 2018; runner-up: 2017
 Malaysia Super League runner-up: 2017, 2018

References

External links
 

1996 births
Living people
Malaysian footballers
Sri Pahang FC players
Malaysia Super League players
Association football midfielders
People from Pahang